J.B. Petit High School is a private all-girls school in the Fort neighbourhood of Mumbai, Maharashtra, India established in 1865. The school currently offers the ICSE board.

History 

The school was originally established as 'Miss Prescott's Fort Christian School' by an English woman in 1865, thanks to donations from city philanthropists like the distinguished Premchand Roychand. It was later renamed the 'Frere Fletcher School'. In 1965 the school was sought to be merged with the Cathedral Girls School when Mr. Jehangir Bomanji Petit took over the schools administration. Although established and run by members of the Zoroastrian community, Mr. Petit wanted to ensure that the school maintained its cosmopolitan and diverse character. The 'J. B. Petit High School for Girls' as it came to be called after its savior, still maintains this cosmopolitan nature today. In 1973, the school came under the leadership of principal Shirin Darasha who brought to the school a zeal for drama and the arts that is still prevalent today as well as progressive ideas and methods of education.

Famous alumni 
The famous cine actress and singer Suraiya attended the school in the 1940s, from where she used to go for her singing and acting roles in films while still a child. The first Indian woman lawyer at the Bombay High Court, as well as the first Indian woman barrister, Mithan Jamshed Lam was also an alumna of the school.

References

Schools in Maharashtra
Schools in Mumbai
Private schools in Mumbai
High schools and secondary schools in Maharashtra
High schools and secondary schools in Mumbai
Girls' schools in India
Girls' schools in Maharashtra